The Amazon Venture oil spill occurred at the port of Savannah on the Savannah River in the U.S. state of Georgia. The spill, which occurred from December 4 to 6, 1986, was caused by three defective valves in the piping system of the oil tanker MV Amazon Venture, which leaked approximately 500,000 US gallons (roughly ) of fuel oil into the river.

Authorities at the port were made aware of oil in the river approximately three hours after the ship began offloading its oil, but due to difficulties in locating the source of the spill, the ship was allowed to continue offloading until it completed on December 6. That same day, chemical testing revealed that the ship had been responsible for the spill. Officials focused primarily on protecting the Savannah National Wildlife Refuge, a protected area upriver from the port that included a large amount of marshland and served as a habitat for several endangered species. However, due to strong tidal currents, containment booms proved ineffective and about a third of the refuge would be contaminated by oil.

The spill is considered one of the worst environmental disasters in the region, with particular concern regarding the long-term effects of the contamination on the wildlife refuge. The company that operated the tanker agreed to pay $1.2 million in damages to the U.S. federal government and the states of Georgia and South Carolina, while total damage claims from the spill totaled between $7 million and $8 million.

Background 

The MV Amazon Venture was a tanker that was operated by the Greece-based Calluna Maritime Corporation. On December 4, 1986, the ship docked at the Garden City Terminal of the Port of Savannah in the U.S. state of Georgia. The terminal was located approximately  upriver from the Atlantic Ocean on the bank of the Savannah River near Savannah, Georgia. Five endangered species inhabited the refuge: the bald eagle, the peregrine falcon, the red-cockaded woodpecker, the shortnose sturgeon, and the wood stork. At that time, the ship was the only tanker at the port carrying number 6 fuel oil. While docking on December 4, the vessel ran aground, with the port-side bilge keel scraping the bottom of the riverbed.

At the time, the ship was transporting oil to Consolidated Edison, which had had an oil spill about a week prior that was in the process of being cleaned up. As a result, it was not realized at the time that this new spill had occurred, and only later oil sampling confirmed that the Amazon Venture had been responsible for a leak in New York.

Oil spill

Detection and response 
On the night of December 4, 1986, as the Amazon Venture began offloading its cargo, oil began spilling from the ship due to three faulty valves. Approximately 3 hours after this began, the U.S. Customs Service became aware of oil in the river and contacted the Marine Safety Office (MSO) of the U.S. Coast Guard based in Savannah. The Coast Guard was notified at 11:30 p.m. and personnel were present at the scene approximately 30 minutes later. They gave an initial estimate of a minor spill involving , a figure still large enough that the spill was of federal concern. With this, several federal and state agencies were brought in to assess the situation and oil samples from ships at the dock were collected to be chemically analyzed to see if they matched the oil found in the river. While oil testing such as this would normally have been conducted at the Coast Guard's Central Oil Identification Laboratory in Groton, Connecticut, arrangements were made to have the tests performed in a more timely manner by the South Carolina Department of Health and Environmental Control at their facilities in Columbia, South Carolina. After the discovery of oil in the river, the Amazon Venture was ordered to stop offloading, but after an initial inspection found no evidence of leaking, it began offloading again at 12:40 a.m. on December 5. It would continue until its offloading was completed at 3:18 a.m. on December 6.

At daybreak on December 5, the Coast Guard began to perform surveys on the area of the river near the port to determine the size and scope of the spill. These surveys showed oil contamination along an  section of the river, stretching upriver to the Houlihan Bridge and downriver to the port's East Coast Terminal. The same day that the surveys were being conducted, the Coast Guard set up booms around the terminal to prevent the oil from spreading. Over the following several days, booms were placed near the terminal, in the Savannah National Wildlife Refuge, and along the Wilmington River, which connected to the Savannah River downstream from the spill. However, due to strong tidal currents, the booms were mostly ineffective and contained only a small amount of the oil. On the evening of December 5, a diver discovered a crack on the hull of the Amazon Venture, though further sounding of the oil tanks did not show water had entered them. However, on the morning of December 6, chemical analysis revealed that the oil had come from the Amazon Venture, though it was still unknown what had caused the oil spill to occur. Around the same time, aerial surveys conducted on a daily basis by the National Oceanic and Atmospheric Administration (NOAA) and the Coast Guard led them to believe that the spill was much larger than previously estimated. As a result, five members of the Coast Guard's Gulf Strike Team in Mobile, Alabama who were trained in managing oil spills were brought in to help with surveying. That evening, the cause of the spill was determined: while offloading the oil, the ship was also pumping oil through its ballast piping system, which was then discharged from the ship's sea chest on its port side. This action was the result of three valves that had all malfunctioned at the same time, and later analyses of these valves revealed that the most likely cause for these failures was a section of -diameter rope measuring between  that had become stuck in the valves and prevented them from seating. This inspection also led investigators to believe that the grounding was not the cause of the spill. As a result of the discovery, the Coast Guard ordered that the three valves be removed and steel plates put in their place to physically prevent flow through that piping system. After this discovery was made, Calluna Maritime accepted responsibility for the spill and subsequent cleanup.

Cleanup efforts 

On December 9, in an effort to slow the movement of the oil upriver towards the wildlife refuge, the U.S. Army Corps of Engineers temporarily opened tidal gates on the Back River, a channel that was bifurcated from the main channel of the Savannah River. These gates would remain open until December 16 and aided in the cleanup process, which was led by the Coast Guard and involved six private contractors, including two that had been hired directly by Calluna Maritime. Calluna retained the International Tanker Owners Pollution Federation of London to oversee its part of the cleanup efforts, and O'Brien's Oil Pollution Service, Inc. of Gretna, Louisiana was designated as the prime cleanup coordinator. This emphasis on the refuge was echoed by Savannah Mayor John Rousakis, who stated that the refuge might be the area most affected by the spill. Additional focus was placed on Abercorn Creek, due to its water intake. However, the containment efforts were hindered due to both strong tidal currents and the inability to spread the booms across the width of the river. The presence of oil in areas thought to be protected by the booms was confirmed in part by oil found in the meat of shellfish from these areas.

This followed gauge measurements taken on December 8 that had shown a discrepancy of 500,000 US gallons between the amount of oil that had left the ship and the amount of oil that had been received at the terminal. With the declaration of a major spill, a Regional Response Team was officially mobilized, although many of the constituent agencies that made up the team were already involved in handling the spill. Also on December 11, the Amazon Venture departed from the port after the ship's insurer gave assurances to the Coast Guard that they would pay for the cleanup and posted a $5.2 million bond in a United States district court to cover any civil damage claims. According to a representative for the Coast Guard, "It's not a situation where the whole river has been covered with oil. It's a situation where you have patches of oil and there'll probably be an oil sheen for a while to come. But with the activity on the river at the port and with dredging, the nature of the river front means you're going to have some oil sheen." In the case of marshlands that had been contaminated with oil, NOAA recommended on allowing the oil to naturally dissipate, as a manual cleanup could have caused additional damage to that environment.

On December 14, United Press International reported that sheen from the oil was present  upriver and  downriver, to the mouth, having been moved that far due to the flow of the river and through the tide. However, at the time there were no reports of fish kills or dead birds, though birds with oil-soaked wings had been spotted in the contaminated area. That same day, cleanup efforts shifted from removing oil from the river to removing contamination that had accumulated on the shoreline. Around this same time, Mayor Rousakis stated that the Georgia Ports Authority had been unprepared to respond to a situation like the spill. By December 17, the Associated Press reported that cleanup efforts had shifted towards the Wassaw Sound near the mouth of the Savannah River at the northern coast of Tybee Island, which was home to large populations of shellfish. That same day, it was reported that oil was visible  both up and downriver, but that much of the thick oil globules had been recovered. By January 12, 1987, the surface of the Savannah River appeared to be free of any recoverable oil or oil-based debris.

On March 13, the Federal On Scene Coordinator, Coast Guard Captain John E. Shkor (the captain of the port for the United States Coast Guard sector that covered Savannah) officially declared the cleanup complete, finishing approximately two weeks ahead of schedule.

Aftermath 
Following the spill, the Amazon Venture docked at the Port of Jacksonville, where a further  of oil spilled from the ship. This occurred despite the three faulty valves on the ship having been removed and replaced with steel plates due to residual oil that had been left in the piping system. Authorities in Jacksonville had been alerted by authorities in Savannah prior to the ship's arrival and had prepared for the possibility of another oil spill, and as a result, the oil was collected shortly after the spill occurred.

The spill was considered one of the worst environmental disasters in the region's history. United Press International called the oil spill "the Georgia coast's worst environmental disaster", while U.S. Representative Lindsay Thomas (who represented Georgia's 1st congressional district, to which Savannah belonged) called it "the worst spill in our state's history". The uncertain long-term effects on the environment, and in particular the wildlife refuge, were of significant concern to many local leaders. Mayor Rousakis stated, "I don't know what the lasting damages will be but I'm sure there will be some damages in marshes and wildlife areas for a few years to come", a sentiment echoed by Hans Neuhauser, a local director of the environmental group Georgia Conservancy, who said, "There is a great deal of concern because we don't know the lasting effects this could have on the area".

Many areas contaminated by the spill bore a noticeable "bathtub ring" for some time after the accident. Air pollution, which is not commonly observed in oil spills, also increased due to the evaporation of the oil.

Economically, the spill directly affected tourism in the area, as tourist attractions such as the Fort Pulaski National Monument and River Street reported fewer visitors following the spill. Additionally, hunting and fishing in the refuge was suspended following the spill, with fishing activities resuming 18 days later and waterfowl hunting resuming 12 days later. Approximately  of oyster beds, much of which had been closed to fishing for several decades prior, were again closed only one month after they had been opened.

Following the spill, the states of Georgia and South Carolina, as well as the federal government, filed damage claims against the Calluna Maritime Corporation. Additionally, the U.S. Fish and Wildlife Service, the National Marine Fisheries Service, the National Park Service, and the natural resources departments of both states prepared for an assessment on the natural damages done by the spill. However, by early 1987, Calluna Maritime agreed to settle out of court, negating the need for an assessment. The corporation agreed to pay out $1.2 million in damages, with $480,000 going to the federal government, $500,000 going to Georgia, $240,000 to South Carolina. The Fish and Wildlife Service received $386,000 from this settlement. Total damage claims, including those made by the federal government, state governments, and 34 private claims, totaled between $7 million and $8 million. Overall cleanup costs for the spill exceeded $5 million, which was more than the corporation's liability limit under the terms of the Clean Water Act.

On April 6, 1987, the United States House Committee on Merchant Marine and Fisheries held a hearing in Savannah pertaining to the spill to gather information on the cause of the spill, how cleanup efforts were handled, and what policy changes could be made to reduce the chances of a similar spill from occurring. The hearing included testimony from several officials who had been involved in both the initial response and cleanup efforts.

See also 
 List of oil spills

Notes

References

Sources

Further reading 
 
 
 

1986 disasters in the United States
1986 in Georgia (U.S. state)
1986 in South Carolina
1986 in the environment
1986 industrial disasters
December 1986 events in the United States
Disasters in Georgia (U.S. state)
Environment of Georgia (U.S. state)
Environment of South Carolina
History of Savannah, Georgia
Maritime incidents in 1986
Oil spills in the United States
Savannah River
Transportation disasters in Georgia (U.S. state)
Transportation disasters in South Carolina